Popular Area (AP) was a centre-right and mainly Christian-democratic coalition, which included two parliamentary groups active in each house of the Italian Parliament: the Chamber of Deputies and the Senate.

"Popular" was a reference to popolarismo, the Italian variety of Christian democracy.

History
The groups, launched in December 2014, originally included 34 deputies and 36 senators, comprising the New Centre-Right (NCD), the Union of the Centre (UdC), some dissidents from Civic Choice (SC) and a splinter from the Five Star Movement (M5S). The UdC and most former SC members were previously affiliated to the For Italy groups.

In the 2015 regional elections, Popular Area ran lists in Veneto, Liguria and Tuscany. In Campania and Umbria the names "Popular Campania" and "For Popular Umbria" were used, respectively. Finally, in Marche and Apulia, the NCD (without the UdC) formed a joint list with Marche 2020 and Francesco Schittulli's movement, respectively, under the Popular Area banner. The best results were obtained in Apulia (6.0%), Campania (4.0%) and Marche (4.0%); in Apulia and Marche the UdC, which was in alliance with the centre-left Democratic Party (PD), scored 6.0% and 3.4%, respectively.

In the run-up of the 2016 constitutional referendum the UdC campaigned for the "No", while the NCD was among the keenest supporters of the "Yes". After the referendum, which saw a huge defeat of the "Yes" side, the UdC left Popular Area altogether. However, some UdC splinters, notably including Pier Ferdinando Casini, Gianpiero D'Alia and Gian Luca Galletti, launched an alternative party named Centrists for Europe (CpE) and confirmed their alliance with the NCD within Popular Area.

In March 2017 the NCD was dissolved into Popular Alternative (AP) and also Popular Area was set aside.

Composition
The alliance was originally composed by the following two parties:

Since December 2016, the alliance is composed by the following parties:

Electoral results

Regional Councils

Leadership
Group Leader in the Chamber of Deputies: Nunzia De Girolamo (2014–2015), Maurizio Lupi (2015–2017)
Group Leader in the Senate: Maurizio Sacconi (2014–2015), Renato Schifani (2015–2016), Laura Bianconi (2016–2017)

References

2014 establishments in Italy
2017 disestablishments in Italy
Defunct political party alliances in Italy
Political parties disestablished in 2017
Political parties established in 2014